Spider-Man Classics is a term used by collectors most commonly to refer to several action figure lines produced by Toy Biz focusing on Spider-Man and his allies and enemies. The lines have over 17 series, with dozens of Spider-Man incarnations and many of his famous enemies. The toyline lasted 5 years starting from 2001 to 2005. A year later, ToyBiz released a new series titled "The Amazing Spider-Man". That same year, by changing the license from Marvel at the hands of Hasbro, they released Spider-Man Origins. In 2008, Hasbro released a reboot of Spider-Man Classics simply called "Spider-Man".

History
The Spider-Man Classics line was released in 2001, and was the first 6" scale line of its kind to be produced by ToyBiz with highly detailed and articulated figures. Toybiz's ambitions for the line were intended to aim figures towards adult collectors as well as kids. The line consisted of two series plus several exclusives and had clamshell packaging inclusive of a comic book copy or poster significant to the figure. The line then changed no longer using the purple 'Spider-Man Classics' logo and appealed more towards kids with similarly scaled and articulated figures for the adult collector but usually including a gimmick of some sort with smaller packaging less the comic book. ToyBiz then continued the concept of clamshell packaging with inclusive comic book for their Marvel Legends line in 2002.

Previous to the 6" line released in 2001 with clamshell packaging, Toybiz had used the 'Spider-Man Classics' logo for 5" scale figures with less articulation for a series of 2 packs as well as a series titled 'Spider-Man Classics Water Wars'.

Spider-Man Classics

With the series' success, it was spun-off into Marvel Legends. At that point, the toyline ended and was replaced by a new one simply called Spider-Man on the packaging but "Spider-Man Classic" (notice the singular form) on ToyBiz's website. The new line has blister card packaging, and no comics are included.

Many of these Spider-Man costumes have not been worn in the comic books. Many of the Spider-Man figures contain many points of articulation, including lateral slides and pull outs, torso hinges (or in the case of Snap-Shot and Black Costume Spider-Man, ball joint and hinges), and individualized fingers.

Spider-Man Classic
Beginning with Series 16, the logo design on the packaging was changed to "Amazing Spider-Man," but Toy Biz kept the series numbering and "Spider-Man Classic" identification on their website.

5" Spider-Man Classics Vs Packs

Spider-Man Classic Clashes Packs

Villain Series (2005)
ToyBiz rereleased figures from the Spider-Man line.

Spider-Man Classics: Movie Series

Spider-Man Origins (By Hasbro)

Hasbro re-released figures from ToyBiz in a metallic or repainted design and features new characters.

Battle Packs

Spider-Man (By Hasbro, 2009)
 Spider-Man is a line by Hasbro that seems to focus more on children. Just like Spider-Man Origins, they repainted some ToyBiz figures, and also featured new characters.

External links
marvellegends.net

Marvel Comics action figure lines
Spider-Man toys